= Daoxiang Lake Park =

Park in Beijing, China

- Type: Urban park, Wetland
- Location: Beijing, China
- Area: about 12 km2
- Created: 1984
- Status: Open all year

Daoxiang Lake Park (also known as Daoxianghu Park or Daoxianghu Wetland Park) is a major public park in northwestern Beijing. This park was created by local residents with money raised by themselves in 1984. Daoxiang Lake Park is one of the largest public parks with views of wetlands and agricultural fields in Beijing. It is also the habitat of many bird species.
